Metal-coated crystals are artificial products made by coating crystals, such as quartz, with metal to give them an iridescent metallic sheen. Crystals treated this way are used as gemstones and for other decorative purposes. Possible coatings include gold, indium, titanium, niobium and copper. Other names for crystals treated in this way include aqua aura, angel aura, flame aura, opal aura or rainbow quartz.

Production 

Such products are created in a vacuum chamber by vapour deposition. Quartz is heated to 871 °C in vacuum, and golden wire is heated to even higher temperature, either by resistive heating with direct electrical current, or by magnetron. Gold sublimation occurs, and subsequently deposition on crystal's surface.

When viewed under a gemological microscope in diffused direct transmitted light, aqua aura displays the following properties:
a coppery surface iridescence in tangential illumination
diffused dark outlines of some facet junctions
a patchy blue colour distribution on some facets
white facet junctions, irregular white abrasions and surface pits, where the treatment either did not "take" or had been abraded away.

The brilliant color of these products is the result of optical interference effects produced by layers of metal.

See also
Rhinestone

References

External links

Crystals
Gemstones